Woodborough may refer to two places in England:

 Woodborough, Nottinghamshire
 Woodborough, Wiltshire

See also 
 Woodboro, Wisconsin